Dasineura plicatrix is a species of gall midge, an insect in the family Cecidomyiidae, found in Europe. It was described by the German entomologist Friedrich Hermann Loew in 1850. The larvae feed within the tissue of bramble leaves, creating an abnormal growth known as a plant gall.

Description
Signs of Dasineura plicatrix are contorted, young bramble leaves, which are found in the spring and early summer. The leaves can be creased, pleated or pluckered, with thickened veins, and conspicuous black staining around the gall. The white larvae can be found until early summer when they drop out of the galls and pupate in the soil. There is disagreement in the literature as to whether there is a single generation a year or several per year. The gall is often overlooked as just a crumpled leaf.

Galls have been found on the following species,

 Rubus caesius – European dewberry
 Rubus canescens
 Rubus fruticosus – blackberry
 Rubus gracilis
 Rubus hirtus
 Rubus idaeus – raspberry
 Rubus plicatus
 Rubus ulmifolius – elmleaf blackberry
 Rubus vestitus

Distribution
Found in Europe, it is common in Great Britain.

Inquiline
Lestodiplosis plicatricis is an inquiline; a lodger or tenant of Dasineura plicatrix and live in the gall.

References

Cecidomyiinae
Diptera of Europe
Gall-inducing insects
Insects described in 1850
Taxa named by Hermann Loew